Slovene philosophy includes philosophers who were either Slovenes or came from what is now Slovenia.

Medieval philosophy
Herman of Carinthia ( 1100 –  1160)

Renaissance
Matija Hvale (Latinized: Matthias Qualle) (1470–1518)

Enlightenment
Anton Ambschel (1746–1821)
Franc Samuel Karpe (1747–1806)

19th-century philosophy

Laical philosophy
Anton Füster (1808–1881)

Neo-Scholasticists
Anton Mahnič (1850–1920)
Aleš Ušeničnik (1868–1952)

20th-century philosophy

Post-World War II philosophy

Phenomenologists
Ivo Urbančič (born 1930)
Tine Hribar (born 1941)
Dean Komel (born 1960)

Personalists
Edvard Kocbek (1904–1981)
Edvard Kovač (born 1950)

Marxists
Božidar Debenjak (born 1935)
Lev Kreft (born 1951)

Lacanians and critical theorists
Slavoj Žižek (born 1949)
Renata Salecl (born 1962)
Mladen Dolar (born 1951)
Rastko Močnik (born 1944)
Rado Riha (born 1948)
Jelica Šumič Riha (born 1958)
Alenka Zupančič (born 1966)

Philosophers
Slovenia